Tahirah Memory is a jazz and soul singer. She is from Portland, Oregon and has performed internationally.

Career 
Memory's performances have been described as intimate experiences for the audience. Her albums include Pride (2015) and Asha (2019); Asha was nominated for several SoulTracks awards. Pride was produced by Jarrod Lawson. Memory has performed with Lawson in London and Birmingham. In 2013 Memory performed at a benefit for the American Music Program, run by her father, Thara Memory.

Memory performed at the Skanner Foundation's 35th annual Martin Luther King, Jr. breakfast in 2021 and was a headliner of the Portland Black Music Expo in fall 2021.

Personal life 
Memory is a single parent. Her father was famous Portland jazz trumpeter Thara Memory.

References 

Living people
American jazz singers
Musicians from Portland, Oregon
Singers from Oregon
Year of birth missing (living people)